Jone Qovu Nailiko (born Sigatoka, 27 August 1985) is a Fijian rugby union player. He plays as a number eight for Niortais.

Played formerly for Racing Metro and La Rochelle in the Top 14 in France.

Selected for Fiji schoolboys U18 tour to NZ in 2002 after impressing with his size and physicality for Sigatoka Methodist College in the Deans Trophy competition. Played alongside future flying fijians players in Talemaitoga Tuapati, Derryk Thomas and Waisale Sukanaveita.

Career
He currently plays for Stade Niortais, in France. Qovu made his debut for Fiji on 3 June 2005, in a 27–29 loss to New Zealand Maori. He was selected for the 2007 Rugby World Cup finals and he played in the 12–55 loss to Australia.

External links
 Fiji profile
 Racing Métro profile
 Scrum profile

References

1985 births
Fijian rugby union players
Rugby union number eights
Living people
Fiji international rugby union players
Racing 92 players
Fijian expatriate rugby union players
Expatriate rugby union players in France
Fijian expatriate sportspeople in France
People from Sigatoka
I-Taukei Fijian people